Esterel is a programming language.

Esterel or Estérel may also refer to:
Esterel Technologies, a software company
 Estérel, Quebec, a city in Canada
 Massif de l'Esterel, a mountain range in France
MV Esterel, a British ship